During the years 2016–17, multiple attacks on political activists and religious leaders  in the northern Indian state of Punjab were  perpetrated by individuals who were allegedly affiliated with the extremist Khalistani group Khalistan Liberation Force. Those culpable for the attacks were also arrested. The Pakistani agency ISI was allegedly held responsible by India for financing and aiding the militant acts to foment religious disturbances in the state.

Attacks

18 January 2016 - Two motorcycle-borne persons wearing monkey caps fired gun shots at new Kidwai Nagar Park in Ludhiana city. The place was to host a Rashtriya Swayamsevak Sangh shakha (assembly) later in the day. No one was injured in the firing as the venue was vacant at the time of attack.
18 January 2016 - Rashtriya Swayamsevak Sangh (RSS) leader Naresh Kumar shot at and injured by masked motorcycle-borne men at Kidwai Nagar's Shaheedi Park in Ludhiana city.
3 February 2016 - Amit Arora, Shiv Sena leader, was attacked by two motorcycle-borne persons while he was sitting in his car in Ludhiana.
16 February 2016 -  Shiv Sena leader Deepak Jalandhari shot at and injured by motorcycle-borne attackers in Jalandhar city.
24 April 2016 - Durga Prasad Gupta shot dead by two motorcycle-borne assassins in Khanna city. He was the President of Mazdoor Sena, labour wing of Shiv Sena Punjab. Dashmesh Regiment claims responsibility for the killing.
6 August 2016 - RSS leader Brigadier (retd) Jagdish Gagneja was shot at by motorcycle-borne persons in Chandigarh. He was admitted to hospital and died on Sep 22. Dashmesh Regiment, sent emails to media claiming responsibility for the killings.
14 January 2017 - Amit Sharma, religious preacher at Hindu Takht and political activist of Indian National Congress killed in Ludhiana city by two motorcycle-borne assassins.
25 February 2017 - Dera Sacha Sauda followers Satpal Kumar and his son Ramesh Kumar killed at a naam charcha ghar (prayer hall) in Jagera village near Malaudh by two shooters on a motorcycle.
15 July 2017 - Sultan Masih, a pastor at Temple of God church, in Ludhiana city was shot dead by motorcycle-borne assassins who fired multiple shots killing him on the spot.
17 October 2017 - RSS and Bharatiya Janata Party leader Ravinder Gosai shot dead in Ludhiana by two motorcycle-borne assassins.
30 October 2017 - Vipan Sharma, leader of Hindu Sangharsh Sena, was shot dead in Amritsar city by two masked men. One of the shooter, Saraj Singh Sandhu, was arrested by police on 6 March 2018.

Investigations

On 4 November 2017, Punjab Police arrested Jagtar Singh Johal alias Jaggi, from Rama Mandi town of Jalandhar and accused him of the attacks. Jaggi is a non-resident Indian residing in Dumbarton and allegedly ran a website named ‘Never Forget 1984’. He is accused of radicalising people and providing weapons to carry out the attacks.

On 12 November 2017, Hardeep Singh alias Harman alias Shera accused of being one of the shooter's in the assassinations was arrested by police after a massive manhunt.

Gursharanbir Singh, a British national, described as the mastermind of the attacks has been declared a proclaimed offender. He is one of the accused in the murder of Rulda Singh, president of the Rashtriya Sikh Sangat, in 2009. The Crown Prosecution Service in the UK has stated that the evidence presented by the Indian authorities is “not sufficient to make out a case to answer”.

See also 

 List of terrorist incidents in Punjab, India
 Insurgency in Punjab
 Khalistan movement

References

External links 

 

Terrorism in India
Khalistan movement
Sikh terrorism in India
Crime in Punjab, India
Victims of Sikh terrorism
2016 murders in India
2017 murders in India
Terrorist incidents in India in 2016
Terrorist incidents in India in 2017